Sigurður Sigurðsson (22 April 1914 – 12 April 1982) was an Icelandic athlete. He competed in the men's triple jump and the men's high jump at the 1936 Summer Olympics.

References

1914 births
1982 deaths
Athletes (track and field) at the 1936 Summer Olympics
Icelandic male triple jumpers
Icelandic male high jumpers
Olympic athletes of Iceland
Place of birth missing